Michel Diogoye Diouf (born 19 April 1989) is a Senegalese basketball player for Bakken Bears and . Diouf is a four-time winner of the Basketligaen Defender of the Year award. He is the current all-time leader in points, rebounds and blocks in the FIBA Europe Cup.

Career
In the 2020–21 season, Diouf won his fifth Basketligaen championship with Bakken Bears and was named the Finals MVP. On 21 March 2022, Diouf became the all-time leading scorer of the FIBA Europe Cup in a quarterfinal game against Oradea. He surpassed Trae Golden's record of 789 total points.

Honours

Club
Bakken Bears
5× Basketligaen: (2017, 2018, 2019, 2020, 2021)

Individual
4× Basketligaen Defender of the Year: (2016, 2018, 2019, 2020)
Basketligaen Finals MVP: (2021)

References

1989 births
Living people
Bakken Bears players
Baloncesto Fuenlabrada players
CB Breogán players
CB Miraflores players
Palencia Baloncesto players
Senegalese men's basketball players